Sir Gavanani (also Romanized as Sīr Gavanānī; also known as Sar Kavanānī) is a village in Kahnuk Rural District, Irandegan District, Khash County, Sistan and Baluchestan Province, Iran. At the 2006 census, its population was 83, in 20 families.

References 

Populated places in Khash County